Gennady S. Bisnovatyi-Kogan is an astrophysicist. He is known for predicting binary radio pulsars.

Bisnovatyi-Kogan was a student at Moscow Institute of Physics and Technology from 1958-1964. He was a postgraduate student at Moscow Institute of Physics and Technology and Keldysh Institute of Applied Mathematics from 1964-1967.

Bisnovatyi-Kogan's PhD thesis was titled "Late stages of stellar evolution" (1968, Keldysh Institute of Applied Mathematics). His doctoral thesis was titled "The equilibrium and stability of stars and stellar systems" (1977, Russian Space Research Institute).

He was employed as a Junior Scientific Fellow at Keldysh Institute of Applied Mathematics from 1967-1974. Since 1974 he has worked at the Russian Space Research Institute.

External links
 Member of US/Russia Collaboration on Plasma Astrophysics
 List of Astronomers

1941 births
Russian astrophysicists
Living people
Moscow Institute of Physics and Technology alumni
Soviet astrophysicists